Geoengineering (Geo-engineering) most commonly refers to climate engineering.

Geoengineering may also refer to:

 Geological engineering, a hybrid discipline that comprises elements of civil engineering, mining engineering, petroleum engineering, and earth science
 Engineering geology, the application of the geological sciences to engineering study
 Geotechnical engineering, the branch of civil engineering concerned with the engineering behavior of earth materials
 Geophysical engineering, the application of geophysics to the engineering design of facilities, including roads, tunnels, and mines

See also
Environmental engineering
Geoprofessions
Terraforming